Edson Stroll (January 6, 1929 – July 18, 2011) was an American actor who appeared in over 20 film and television programs beginning in 1958.

Career
Born in Chicago to Charles Stroll and Estelle Rose Stroll in a Jewish family, Stroll enlisted in the US Navy in the late 1940s then began his career as a bodybuilder in the 1950s.

He studied acting and singing at the American Theater Wing in New York City and received a Fulbright Scholarship for voice performance, followed by an artists’ contract for performance and advance study by the National Broadcasting Company

He did a variety of stage work and from 1958 onwards he had bit parts on television shows such as How to Marry a Millionaire and Sea Hunt. He appeared in two episodes of The Twilight Zone, "Eye of the Beholder" (1960) and "The Trade-Ins" (1962). He played "Dynamite" in the Elvis Presley film G.I. Blues (1960).  He then landed a steady role on McHale's Navy as Virgil Edwards.

Fans of the slapstick comedy team The Three Stooges remember Stroll for his roles in two 1960s-era feature films, Snow White and the Three Stooges and The Three Stooges in Orbit.

In the 1960s, Stroll co-owned a men's high fashion seconds shop in Beverly Hills.

Throughout the 2000s, Stroll provided voice-overs, and he occasionally appeared at Hollywood autograph signing shows, near his Marina del Rey home in Southern California.

Stoll was a licensed ship's captain and marine surveyor.

Death
Edson Stroll died of cancer on July 18, 2011, at the age of 82. His remains were cremated.

References

External links

1929 births
2011 deaths
American male film actors
Male actors from Chicago
Deaths from cancer in California
American bodybuilders
United States Navy sailors